Magisto is a technology company founded in 2009 to provide artificial intelligence (AI) technology for video editing. It produces an online video editor of the same name (both as a web application and a mobile app) for automated video editing and production aimed at consumers and businesses. The company was acquired by Vimeo in 2019 for an estimated US$200 million.

Technology 
Magisto was founded by Dr. Oren Boiman, a computer scientist that graduated from Tel Aviv University followed by graduate work in computer vision at the Weizmann Institute of Science. Boiman developed a number of patent-pending image analysis technologies that analyze unedited videos to identify the most interesting parts. The system recognizes faces, animals, landscapes, action sequences, movements and other important content within the video, as well as analyzing speech and audio. These scenes are then edited together, along with music and effects.

Automatic video editing 
Automated video editing products have emerged to make video editing easier for a broader consumer market. Muvee Technologies introduced autoProducer, the first PC-based automatic video editing platform, in 2001. Other solutions, including Sony's MovieShaker and Roxio Cinematic, followed in 2002. As smartphones and consumer video recording devices become more prevalent the need for an easier video solution has led to a renewed interest in automatic video editing.

Music 
The Magisto app contains a library of music. The music, largely by independent artists, is sorted by mood and is licensed for in-app use.

History 
Magisto was founded in 2009 as SightEra (LTD) by Dr. Oren Boiman (CEO) and Dr. Alex Rav-Acha (CTO). Boiman, frustrated with the amount of time it took editing together videos of his daughter, wanted an easier to use application to capture and share videos.

Magisto was launched publicly on September 20, 2011, as a video editing software web application through which users could upload unedited video footage, choose a title and soundtrack and have their video edited for them automatically. On the following day Magisto was added to YouTube Create's collection of video production applications.

The Magisto iPhone app was launched publicly at the 2012 International Consumer Electronics Show (CES) in Las Vegas. At CES, the company was also awarded the 2012 CES Mobile App Showdown. On August 28, 2012, Magisto launched the Android app on Google Play. On September 13, 2012, Magisto launched a Google Chrome App and announced Google Drive integration.

On March 7, 2013, Magisto claimed 5 million users. Google listed Magisto as an "Editors’ Choice" on its list of "Best Apps of 2013". In September 2013, the company claimed that 10 million users had downloaded the App.

In February 2014, Magisto claimed that they had 20 million users, with 2 million new users per month. The company also confirmed investment from a Russian internet company, Mail.Ru Group. In September 2014 Magisto rolled out a new feature called, ‘Instagram Ready’ which allows users to upload 15 second clips that are automatically formatted for Instagram. In the same month Magisto also launched a new feature for iOS and Android users, called ‘Surprise Me’ which creates video from still photographs on users’ smartphones. In October 2014, Magisto was placed 9th on the 2014 Deloitte Israel Technology Fast 50 list and named as a finalist in the Red Herring's Top 100 Europe award. 

In January 2015, Magisto participated in a statistical analysis on the habits of smartphone users in conjunction with Gigaom. In July 2015, Magisto released an editing theme dedicated to musician Jerry Garcia.

In April 2019, the company was acquired by Vimeo, the IAC-owned platform for hosting, sharing and monetizing streamed video, for an estimated $200 million.

Funding rounds 
In 2010, the company received more than $5.5 million in Series A round and B venture round funding from Magma Venture Partners and Horizons Ventures.

In September 2011, at the same time as the public launch of their web application, Magisto announced a $5.5 million Series B funding round led by Li Ka-shing’s Horizons Ventures. Li Ka-Shing is known for making early-stage investments in companies like Facebook, Spotify, SecondMarket and Siri.

In 2014, the company received $2 million in Venture Funding from Magma Venture Partners, Qualcomm Ventures, Horizons Ventures and the Mail.Ru Group.

Business model 
Magisto has a freemium business model: Users can create basic video clips for free. In addition, advanced business, professional and personal service tiers are available via various subscription plans, unlocking more features; such as longer videos, HD, premium themes, customization and control features.

Awards 
 Magisto won first place at Technonomy3, an annual Internet Technology start-up competition in Israel. Judges of the competition included Jeff Pulver, TechCrunch editor Mike Butcher, investor Yaron Samid, Bessemer Venture Partners Israel partner Adam Fisher and Brad McCarty of The Next Web.
 Magisto won first place at CES 2012 Mobile app competition, during the launch of Magisto iOS mobile app.
 Magisto was awarded twice the Google Play Editor's Choice and was part of iPhone App Store Best App awards for 2013 and 2014, and Wired Essential iPad Apps.
 Magisto was declared by Deloitte as the 7th fastest growing companies in EMEA in 2016.

See also 

 Video editing
 Video server
 Edit Decision List
 Photo slideshow software
 Video scratching
 Video editing software
 Comparison of video editing software
 List of video editing software
 Web application
 Web Processing Service
 High-definition video

References

External links 
 

Vimeo
Film and video technology
Video processing
Software architecture
 Magisto
Web development
Defunct software companies of the United States